SS Queen of Bermuda was a British turbo-electric ocean liner that belonged to Furness, Withy & Co Ltd. Its Furness Bermuda Line subsidiary operated her between New York and Bermuda before and after the Second World War. During the war she served as first an armed merchant cruiser and then as a troop ship.

Building
Furness, Withy ordered Queen of Bermuda to replace the liner , which had been destroyed by fire in June 1931 after barely three and a half years' service. Queen of Bermuda was the sister ship of Monarch of Bermuda which had been launched in March 1931 and entered service that December.

Vickers-Armstrongs built Queen of Bermuda at its shipyard in Barrow-in-Furness. She was launched on 2 September 1932 and completed in February 1933. She had capacity for refrigerated cargo, and as built she had berths for 700 first class and 31 second class passengers.

The boilers supplied steam at 400 lbf/in2 to two steam turbines. As built, she had three funnels.

Liner, auxiliary cruiser and troop ship
In 1933 Queen of Bermuda joined Monarch of Bermuda on scheduled services between New York and Hamilton, Bermuda. A round trip took six days.

Just before the Second World War, on 29 August 1939 the Admiralty requisitioned the ship for conversion into an armed merchant cruiser. One of her three funnels was removed, either as a disguise or to improve the field of fire for her guns. Her primary armament was seven BL 6-inch Mk XII naval guns. Her secondary armament included two QF 3-inch 20 cwt anti-aircraft guns.

She was commissioned on 28 October as HMS Queen of Bermuda with the pennant number F73. As a cruiser she served on patrol duty and as a convoy escort, mostly in the North and South Atlantic. In March 1941 she visited Deception Island and destroyed shore facilities there to prevent their use by German merchant cruisers. In 1943 she served with the Eastern Fleet in the Indian Ocean and made one visit to Fremantle in Western Australia.

In May 1943 the Admiralty returned the ship to Furness, Withy and the Ministry of War Transport had her refitted as a troop ship. For the next two years she carried troops between Britain, Gibraltar, Port Said in Egypt and Taranto in Italy, and in 1945 she made one visit to Bombay. In 1946 she repatriated Italian prisoners of war from Liverpool to Naples and UK military personnel from the Far East to Britain. She operated between Liverpool, Bombay and Singapore.

Post-war civilian service
In 1947 the UK Government released the ship for return to civilian service. Furness, Withy had her overhauled and refitted and her third funnel was reinstated. As refitted she had berths for 733 passengers, all first class.

In February 1949 she returned to her pre-war route between New York and Hamilton. Her sister Monarch of Bermuda did not join her as she had been damaged by fire in a shipyard in 1947 and Furness, Withy had sold her. In 1951 a new Furness, Withy ship, the  Ocean Monarch, joined Queen of Bermuda on the route.

1961 Refit 
In October 1961 Harland and Wolff in Belfast started work to modify Queen of Bermuda. She was lengthened, all three funnels were removed and one modern funnel was installed amidships. This gave the ship the distinction of being the only ocean liner to have sailed with one, two and three funnels. Her sea trials began on 23 February 1962 and returned to her regular route on 7 April.

End of Service 
In November 1966 Furness, Withy ceased its Furness Bermuda Line operation. New owners bought Ocean Monarch for further passenger service but Queen of Bermuda was sold for scrap. On 6 December that year she arrived in Faslane in Scotland to be broken up.

References

Bibliography

1932 ships
World War II Auxiliary cruisers of the Royal Navy
Passenger ships of the United Kingdom
Ships built in Barrow-in-Furness
Ships built by Vickers Armstrong
Steamships of the United Kingdom
Troop ships of the United Kingdom